←2013 - 2014 - 2015→

This is a list of Japanese television dramas shown within Japan during the year of 2014.

Winter

2014 Japanese television dramas
Dramas